Ludvig Glacier is a tributary glacier draining north between Arthurson Bluff and Mount Gale to join Kirkby Glacier near the coast of northern Victoria Land, Antarctica. It was named by the Australian National Antarctic Research Expeditions (ANARE) for Ludvig Larsen, chief officer of the ship Thala Dan in which ANARE explored this coast, 1962.

References

Glaciers of Pennell Coast